Scott Lawton may refer to:

Scott Lawton (boxer) (born 1976), English lightweight boxer
Scott Lawton (conductor) (born 1960), Germany based American conductor